"The First Time" is a single by American R&B/pop music trio Surface that hit number one on the Billboard Hot 100 in 1991 for two weeks, the trio's only chart-topper. The song also spent one week at number one on the U.S. R&B chart and two weeks atop the adult contemporary chart.

Charts

Weekly charts

Year-end charts

All-time charts

See also
List of Hot 100 number-one singles of 1991 (U.S.)
List of number-one R&B singles of 1991 (U.S.)
List of Hot Adult Contemporary number ones of 1991

References

External links
  

1990 singles
Surface (band) songs
Billboard Hot 100 number-one singles
Cashbox number-one singles
Contemporary R&B ballads
1990 songs
1990s ballads
Songs written by Bernard Jackson (singer)
Columbia Records singles